Chiesa Nuova was a planned metro station on Line C of the Rome Metro system.

Location
Chiesa Nuova station would have been located underneath the Piazza della Chiesa Nuova, which takes its name from the church of the same name. About  to the east is the famous Piazza Navona. Along with the Chiesa Nuova, there are a number of churches in the immediate area, including the Santa Maria della Pace, Sant'Agnese in Agone, and San Salvatore in Lauro.

References

External links
 Official Line C site

Rome Metro Line C stations